Byzantine blue is a color ranging from light celestial blue or lazuli to dark Egyptian blue.

It is found on Byzantine frescoes of Hagia Sophia, Nerezi (Nerezian blue), in Macedonia.

Variations

Dark Byzantine blue 
The dark variation is best described as the color of the Byzantine night sky; it resembles dark blue-grey, Prussian and Navy blue, well attested on frescoes and mosaics.

References 

Shades of blue
Byzantine art
Byzantine culture